The ninth Annual Pop Corn Music Awards for 1999, in Athens, Greece. The awards recognized the most popular artists and albums in Greece from the year 1999 as voted by Greek music publication Pop Corn. The event was hosted by Eleni Menegaki in 2001. The Pop Corn Music Awards were discontinued in 2002.

Performances

Winners and nominees

References 

1999
1999 music awards